The Wyoming Business Council was founded in 1998 by the State of Wyoming tasked with focusing on building a strong job creation base in Wyoming. The Business Council functions as the economic development agency of the State of Wyoming.

Mission statement

The Wyoming Business Council is Wyoming's state economic development and diversification agency.

The Wyoming Business Council is creating new opportunities for current and future generations of Wyomingites. The agency envisions diverse, broad and lasting growth so Wyoming can prosper no matter the economic climate or th estatus of individual sectors.

The Business Council adds value to the state's core industries, while activating new economic sectors like healthcare, professional services, technology, arts and advanced manufacturing.

The agency serves businesses, entrepreneurs, industry and communities.

Structure 

The Wyoming Business Council is part of the Wyoming state government, but its structure resembles a corporation with a CEO and board of directors.

Offerings & Services 

The Business Council offers infrastructure development grants to accommodate new and expanding businesses; recruits new companies to the state; provides small capital grants to startups; delivers expertise to small businesses; assists in the redevelopment of downtowns; participates with banks to fill the gap in business financing; and partners with nonprofits, local governments and local economic development organizations to assist in community and business projects around the state.

Regional Offices 

The Business Council has regional offices in Casper, Riverton, Powell, Cheyenne, Sheridan and Rock Springs.  The Regional Offices are the first points of contact for individuals, businesses and communities seeking Wyoming Business Council services.  In addition to its divisions, the Business Council provides services to Wyoming citizens in partnership with the University of Wyoming.

Partnerships 

The Wyoming Business Council partners with the Wyoming Economic Development Association, University of Wyoming Business Resource Network, Wyoming Association of Municipalities, Wyoming County Commissioners Association and the Wyoming Office of Tourism, among other organizations, to develop communities and assist small businesses across the state.

References

External links
 WBC Website

Business organizations based in the United States
State agencies of Wyoming
Government agencies established in 1998
1998 establishments in Wyoming